The women's points race in cycling at the 2004 Summer Olympics consisted of a 100 lap (25 kilometre) points race with 10 sprints where points were awarded. 5 points were given to the first finisher of each sprint, with 3 going to the second-place finisher, 2 going to the third place cyclist, and 1 going to the fourth place rider. Cyclists could also score points by lapping the main body of riders, known as the peloton. 20 points were gained by doing this, while 20 points were lost if the peloton lapped the cyclist.

Results
Russian sprinter and 2004 Olympics road race bronze medallist, Olga Slyusareva, was able to win three of the ten sprints, and place in four other sprints to achieve 20 points. The peloton was able to respond to any breakaways so no riders were able to achieve lap points. Mexican rider Belem Guerrero Méndez with 14 points was awarded the silver medal, closely followed by Maria Luisa Calle Williams from Colombia on 12 points. Calle Williams later tested positive for banned stimulant heptaminol, and Erin Mirabella was promoted to the bronze medal position. That decision, however, was later reversed on appeal. As a result of the IOC's 24 October 2005 decision, Mirabella was ordered to return the bronze medal and diploma and Calle's third-place result, bronze medal and diploma were re-instated. 

No cyclists gained points from lapping the peloton.  Three lost a lap, however.

References

External links
Official Olympic Report

W
Cycling at the Summer Olympics – Women's points race
Track cycling at the 2004 Summer Olympics
Olymp
Women's events at the 2004 Summer Olympics